Neale R. Stoner (1936 – February 14, 2023) was an American college athletics coach and administrator. He served as the head men's basketball coach at the University of California, San Diego from 1966 to 1969 and at California Polytechnic State University from 1969 to 1972, compiling a career college basketball coaching record of 86–65. Stoner was the athletic director at California State University, Fullerton from 1972 to 1979 and at the University of Illinois at Urbana–Champaign from 1980 to 1988.

Education
Stoner attended Montebello High School and Fullerton Junior College.  He graduated from Orange County State College in 1962 and received a Master of Education from California Polytechnic State University in 1975.

Playing career
At Orange County State College—now known as California State University, Fullerton—Stoner played two years (1961 and 1962 seasons) on both the varsity men's basketball squad and tennis team. He played on the first Orange County State College men's basketball squad in the 1960–61 season, coached by Alex Omalev, which had a record 16–14. In 30 games played that season he averaged 13.9 points per game, scored 418 points total, and shot 84% from the free throw line.

Coaching career
At Orange State College, Stoner coached Anaheim High School and Fullerton Junior College alumni tennis players Mike Bouck and Stan Kula for the Titans. During the 1962–63 tennis season at Orange State College he coached Rosalie Passovoy, who played on the Titans men's tennis team.  Passovoy is the only female to have lettered on a male varsity sport program at the university.

Death
Stoner died on February 14, 2023, at the age of 86, in Escondido, California.

References

1936 births
2023 deaths
American tennis coaches
Cal Poly Mustangs men's basketball coaches
Cal State Fullerton Titans athletic directors
Cal State Fullerton Titans men's basketball players
Cal State Fullerton Titans men's tennis coaches
Cal State Fullerton Titans men's tennis players
Illinois Fighting Illini athletic directors
San Diego State Aztecs coaches
UC San Diego Tritons men's basketball coaches
UC San Diego Tritons men's tennis coaches
College football bowl executives
College golf coaches in the United States
California Polytechnic State University alumni